Trapped by the Mormons (also released as The Mormon Peril) is a 1922 silent British drama film directed by H. B. Parkinson and starring Evelyn Brent. This anti-Mormon film involves the taking of young virginal English women to Utah to become wives. The film survives in several archives, and a copy of the film has been released on video.

Cast
 Evelyn Brent as Nora Prescott
 Louis Willoughby as Isoldi Keene
 Ward McAllister as Elder Kayler
 Olaf Hytten as Elder Marz
 Olive Sloane as Sadie Keane
 George Wynn as Jim Foster
 Cecil Morton York as Mr. Prescott

See also
Married to a Mormon

References

External links

1922 films
1922 drama films
British drama films
British silent feature films
British black-and-white films
Criticism of Mormonism
Films directed by H. B. Parkinson
Films about Mormonism
Mormonism in fiction
Works about polygamy in Mormonism
1920s British films
Silent drama films